New Gračanica Monastery is a Serbian Orthodox monastery complex is located in Third Lake, Illinois, United States, a suburb of Chicago. The complex houses a scaled-up replica of the Gračanica monastery in Kosovo. It is a part of the Diocese of New Gracanica - Midwestern America. It has 300 acres of land, making it the 6th largest monastery among the 80 American Orthodox Christian monasteries.

History
Built on land that the Most Holy Mother of God Serbian Association purchased in 1977, New Gračanica Church and the main building on its grounds dedicated to the feast of the "Protection of the Most Holy Mother of God" were completed and consecrated in 1984.

Architecture
It is an architectural replica of the original Gračanica in Serbia that is found on UNESCO's World Heritage List, but built in a scale eighteen percent larger than the original. New Gračanica has detail such as hand-carved wooden entrance doors depicting twenty-three monasteries and churches from various regions of Serbia.

The Frescoes

In 1995 famed Polish-American artist Fr. Theodore Jurewicz was commissioned to paint the entire church. Done over the span of three years, Fr. Theodore is held to be one of the most celebrated icon painters in North America today. Painted in a Byzantine style it features richly colored designs and religious scenes covering the walls, vaults, pillars and dome of the church. The frescoes painted by Fr. Theodore like other contemporary icon painters are done in acrylics on dry plaster.

See also 

 List of Serb Orthodox monasteries
 Serbs in USA
 Serbs in Canada
 Serbs in South America
 Saint Sava Serbian Orthodox Monastery and Seminary
 Monastery of St. Paisius, Safford
 Saint Petka Serbian Orthodox Church
 St. Pachomious Monastery
 St. Xenia Serbian Orthodox Skete
 St. Archangel Michael Skete
 Holy Transfiguration Monastery in Milton, Ontario
 St. Nilus Island Skete

Annotations

References

External links 
 Official website

Churches in Illinois
Serbian-American culture in Illinois
Serbian Orthodox monasteries in the United States
Buildings and structures in Lake County, Illinois
Churches in Lake County, Illinois